Christophe Espagnon (born 6 January 1976) is a French sailor, who specialized in the multihull (Tornado) class. Together with his partner Xavier Revil, he was named one of the country's top sailors in the mixed multihull catamaran for the 2008 Summer Olympics, finishing in a distant eleventh position. Outside his Olympic career, he and Revil gave the home crowd a further reason to celebrate with a bronze-medal finish at the 2005 Tornado Worlds in La Rochelle. A member of La Rochelle Sailing Regatta, Espagnon trained most of his competitive sporting career under the tutelage of his personal coach Philippe Neiras.

Espagnon competed for the French sailing squad, as a 32-year-old crew member in the Tornado class, at the 2008 Summer Olympics in Beijing. Building up their Olympic selection, he and skipper Revil finished a credible sixth in the golden fleet phase to lock one of the eleven quota places offered at the 2007 ISAF Worlds in Cascais, Portugal. The French duo started the series with a fantastic top-four mark on the second race; however, a broken halyard lock before race 4 and a wave of unimpressive tenths towards the final stretch bumped Espagnon and Revil out of the medal hunt to eleventh overall by a slight margin, amassing 69 net points.

References

External links
 
 
 
 
 
 

1976 births
Living people
French male sailors (sport)
Olympic sailors of France
Sailors at the 2008 Summer Olympics – Tornado
People from Talence
Sportspeople from Gironde
20th-century French people
21st-century French people